Manuela Friz (born 16 August 1978) is an Italian ice hockey player. She competed in the women's tournament at the 2006 Winter Olympics.

References

External links
 

1978 births
Living people
Italian women's ice hockey players
Olympic ice hockey players of Italy
Ice hockey players at the 2006 Winter Olympics
Sportspeople from the Province of Belluno